The 1942–43 League of Ireland was the 22nd season of senior football in the Republic of Ireland. Cork United were the defending champions.

Changes from 1941–42 
No new teams were elected to the League.

Teams

Season overview
Cork United won their third title, becoming the first team to win three consecutive titles.

Standings

Results

Top goalscorers

See also 

 1942–43 FAI Cup

Ireland
Lea
League of Ireland seasons